Egisto Pandolfini (17 February 1926 – 29 January 2019) was an Italian footballer who played as a midfielder.

Club career
Pandolfini was born in Lastra a Signa. He played for 12 seasons (316 games, 75 goals) in the Serie A for ACF Fiorentina, A.S. Roma, F.C. Internazionale Milano and SPAL 1907.

International career
Pandolfini obtained 21 caps and scored 9 goals for the Italy national team, appearing in both the 1950 and 1954 FIFA World Cups, as well as the 1948 and 1952 editions of the Summer Olympic Games Football Tournament. He died on 29 January 2019, aged 92.

References

External links
Profile by RSSSF

1926 births
2019 deaths
People from Lastra a Signa
Italian footballers
Italy international footballers
1950 FIFA World Cup players
1954 FIFA World Cup players
Olympic footballers of Italy
Footballers at the 1948 Summer Olympics
Footballers at the 1952 Summer Olympics
Serie A players
Serie B players
ACF Fiorentina players
Empoli F.C. players
S.P.A.L. players
A.S. Roma players
Inter Milan players
Association football midfielders
Sportspeople from the Metropolitan City of Florence
Footballers from Tuscany